Jovana Jakšić and Catalina Pella were the defending champions, but decided not to participate.

Sophie Chang and Alexandra Mueller won the title after defeating Ashley Kratzer and Whitney Osuigwe 3–6, 6–4, [10–7] in the final.

Seeds

Draw

Draw

References
Main Draw

Boyd Tinsley Clay Court Classic - Doubles